David Cameron (10 March 1936 – 27 June 2006) was a Scottish professional footballer who played as an inside forward.

Career
Born in Glasgow, Cameron played for Rutherglen Glencairn, Bradford City and Ashfield. For Bradford City, he made 7 appearances in the Football League, scoring twice.

Sources

References

1936 births
2006 deaths
Footballers from Glasgow
Scottish footballers
Association football inside forwards
Rutherglen Glencairn F.C. players
Bradford City A.F.C. players
Ashfield F.C. players
English Football League players